Tullich Hill (632 m) is a hill in the southern Grampian Mountains of Scotland. It lies south of the village of Arrochar, between Loch Long and Loch Lomond in Argyll.

An irregular, rocky hill, its most distinguished feature is the corrie on its southern slopes.

References

Mountains and hills of the Southern Highlands
Mountains and hills of Argyll and Bute
Marilyns of Scotland
Grahams